The year 686 BC was a year of the pre-Julian Roman calendar. In the Roman Empire, it was known as year 68 Ab urbe condita . The denomination 686 BC for this year has been used since the early medieval period, when the Anno Domini calendar era became the prevalent method in Europe for naming years.

Events

Births

Deaths
 Duke Xiang of Qi, ruler of the state of Qi

References